The Shell in situ conversion process (Shell ICP) is an in situ shale oil extraction technology to convert kerogen in oil shale to shale oil. It is developed by the Shell Oil Company.

History
Shell's in situ conversion process has been under development since the early 1980s. Since 2000, additional research and development activities have carried on as a part of the Mahogany Research Project. The oil shale heating at Mahogany started early 2004. From this test site, Shell has recovered  of shale oil.

Process

The process heats sections of the vast oil shale field in situ, releasing the shale oil and oil shale gas from the rock so that it can be pumped to the surface and made into fuel. In this process, a freeze wall is first to be constructed to isolate the processing area from surrounding groundwater. Water is then removed from the working zone. Heating and recovery wells are drilled at  intervals within the working zone. Kerogen in oil shale is slowly converted into shale oil and gases, which then flow to the surface through recovery wells.

Energy consumption
If this amount of electricity were to be generated by a coal-fired power plant, it would consume five million ton of coal annually (about 2.2 million toe). 

In 2006, Shell estimated that over the project life cycle, for every unit of energy consumed, three to four units would be produced.  Such an "energy returned on energy invested" would be significantly better than that achieved in the Mahogany trials. For the 1996 trial, Shell applied 440,000 kWh (which would require about 96 toe energy input in a coal-fired plant), to generate  of oil (37 toe output).

Environmental impacts
Shell's underground conversion process requires significant development on the surface. The separation between drilled wells is less than five meters and wells must be connected by electrical wiring and by piping to storage and processing facilities. Shell estimates that the footprint of extraction operations would be similar to that for conventional oil and gas drilling. However, the dimensions of Shell's 2005 trial indicate that a much larger footprint is required.

Extensive water use and the risk of groundwater pollution are the technology's greatest challenges.

Current implementations

In Israel, IEI, a subsidiary of IDT Corp. is planning a shale pilot based on ICP technology. The project would produce a total of 1,500 barrels. However, IEI has also announced that any subsequent projects would not use ICP technology, but would instead utilize horizontal wells and hot gas heating methods.

In Jordan, Shell subsidiary JOSCO plans to use ICP technology to achieve commercial production by the "late 2020s."  In October, 2011, it was reported that JOSCO had drilled more than 100 test holes over the prior two years, apparently for the sake of testing shale samples.

The Mahogany Oil Shale Project has been abandoned by Shell in 2013 due to unfavorable project economics

See also
 Chevron CRUSH
 ExxonMobil Electrofrac

References

External links
 Mahogany Research Project

Oil shale technology
Shell plc
1997 introductions